Chinese Taipei will participate in the 2011 Asian Winter Games in Almaty and Astana, Kazakhstan from January 30, 2011 to February 6, 2011. Chinese Taipei will send a higher number of athletes to an Asian Winter Games than have been sent previously.

Alpine skiing

Chinese Taipei will send two alpine skiers.
Men
Marcus Chen
Micheal Chen

Biathlon

Men
Liu Yung-chien
Wang Yao-yi

Figure skating

Men

Women

Ice hockey

Men
The team is in the top division for these games.

Group A 

All times are local (UTC+6).

Short track speed skating

Men
Tsai Yu-lun
Yang Bo-kai
Yang Shun-fan
Yang Yang-chun

Women
Chung Hsiao-ying
Lin Wei
Tsou Mu-yin
Yang Szu-han

References

Nations at the 2011 Asian Winter Games
Asian Winter Games
Chinese Taipei at the Asian Winter Games